This is a list of films set in New England. Movies made for television are not included.

This list is incomplete. Please make an annotation describing something about the setting.

1910s

 The House of the Seven Gables (1910) – set in Salem, Massachusetts
 The Scarlet Letter (1911)

1920s
 The Sea Beast (1926)
 The Scarlet Letter (1926)
 The Yankee Clipper (1927)

1930s
 Abraham Lincoln (1930)
 Moby Dick (1930)
 A Connecticut Yankee (1931)
 Horse Feathers (1932)
 Doctor Bull (1933)
 Little Women (1933) – set in Concord, Massachusetts
 The Pursuit of Happiness (1934)
 The Scarlet Letter (1934)
 Ah, Wilderness! (1935) - set in an unnamed New England town, filmed in Grafton, Massachusetts
 Way Down East (1935)
 Mr. Deeds Goes to Town (1936) 
 Captains Courageous (1937)
 Maid of Salem (1937)
 Nothing Sacred (1937)
 Stella Dallas (1937)
 Bringing Up Baby (1938) – they visit Susan's aunt in Connecticut
 Mother Carey's Chickens (1938)
 Dark Victory (1939)
 The Story of Alexander Graham Bell (1939)

1940s
 The House of the Seven Gables (1940) – set in Salem, Massachusetts 
 The Devil and Daniel Webster (1941) 
 Yankee Doodle Dandy (1942) 
 The Loves of Edgar Allan Poe (1942) 
 Holiday Inn (1942) – Connecticut
 The Mummy's Tomb (1942)  
 I Married a Witch (1942)  
 The Adventures of Mark Twain (1944) 
 The Mummy's Ghost (1944) 
 Christmas in Connecticut (1945)
 Leave Her to Heaven (1945)
 Spellbound (1945)
 The Thin Man Goes Home (1945)
 Dragonwyck (1946) 
 The Spiral Staircase (1946) 
 The Stranger (1946)
 The Strange Woman (1946)
 Boomerang (1947)
 Gentleman's Agreement (1947)
 Mourning Becomes Electra (1947)
 Mr. Blandings Builds His Dream House (1948) – Connecticut
 The Babe Ruth Story (1948) – Set in Boston, about the Red Sox and Braves
 Little Women (1949) – set in Concord, Massachusetts
 A Connecticut Yankee in King Arthur's Court (1949)

1950s
 Cheaper by the Dozen (1950)
 Mystery Street (1950) – Massachusetts
 The Underworld Story (1950)
 All About Eve (1950)
 Death of a Salesman (1951)
 The Story of Will Rogers (1952) 
 Plymouth Adventure (1952) – the Pilgrims arrive at Plymouth, Massachusetts
 The Actress (1953) – set in Wollaston, Massachusetts (a neighborhood of the city of Quincy)
 White Christmas (1954) – set in Vermont 
 Seven Angry Men (1955)
 All That Heaven Allows (1955)
 Lady and the Tramp (1955)
 The Trouble with Harry (1955)
 Carousel (1956)
 High Society (1956) – Newport, Rhode Island
 Moby Dick (1956)
 Fear Strikes Out (1957) – set in Boston, about the Red Sox
 Johnny Tremain (1957) – set in Boston
 The Last Hurrah (1958) – a mayoral race based on Boston mayor James Michael Curley
 Rally 'Round the Flag, Boys! (1958) – set in Connecticut
 The Devil's Disciple (1959) – Websterbridge, New Hampshire
 A Summer Place (1959) – set in fictional Pine Island, Maine

1960s
 The Bramble Bush (1960)
 The City of the Dead (1960)
 House of Usher (1960)
 Death of a Salesman (1961)
 The Parent Trap (1961)
 Return to Peyton Place (1961)
 Lolita (1962)
 Long Day's Journey Into Night (1962) – Connecticut
 The Miracle Worker (1962)
 The Cardinal (1963)
 Donovan's Reef (1963)
 The Haunted Palace (1963) – fictional New England town of Arkham
 The Haunting (1963)
 My Six Loves (1963)
 Lilith (1964)
 Never Too Late 1965) 
 Death of a Salesman (1966)
 Hawaii (1966)
 The Russians Are Coming, the Russians Are Coming (1966) – Gloucester, Massachusetts
 Tormented (1966)
 Who's Afraid of Virginia Woolf? (1966) – set at Trinity College in Connecticut
 The Shuttered Room (1967)
 Valley of the Dolls (1967) – Anne starts in New England
 The Boston Strangler (1968) – set in Boston
 Charly (1968) – set in Boston
 Death of a Salesman (1968)
 Pretty Poison (1968) – set in western Massachusetts
 Rachel, Rachel (1968) – Boston
 Salesman (1968) – Boston
 The Thomas Crown Affair (1968) – set in Boston
 The Curse of the Living Corpse (1969)
 Silent Night, Lonely Night (1969)

1970s
 Love Story (1970)
 The Out-of-Towners (1970) – set in Boston
 Carnal Knowledge (1971)
 Let's Scare Jessica to Death (1971)
 The Other (1972)
 Slaughterhouse-Five (1972)
 The Friends of Eddie Coyle (1973) – set in Boston
 The Last Detail (1973) – set in Boston
 The Paper Chase (1973)
 The Scarlet Letter (1973)
 Silent Night, Bloody Night (1974) – set in western Massachusetts
 Jaws (1975) – set in fictional Amity, Massachusetts
 The Stepford Wives (1975)
 The Little Girl Who Lives Down the Lane (1976) – set in fictional Wells Harbor, Maine
 Between the Lines (1977) – set in Boston
 Pete's Dragon (1977)
 Coma (1978) – set in Boston
 Jaws 2 (1978) – set in fictional Amity, Massachusetts
 The Brink's Job (1979) – set in Boston

1980s
 The Children (1980)
 Return of the Secaucus 7 (1980)
 A Small Circle of Friends (1980)
 Dead & Buried (1981)
 The Incubus (1981) – fictional New England town of Galen
 On Golden Pond (1981)
 The Flight of Dragons (1982)
 Superstition (1982)
 The Verdict (1982)
 The World According to Garp (1982)
 The Bostonians (1983)
 The Dead Zone (1983)
 The Devonsville Terror (1983)
 Reuben, Reuben (1983)
 The Hotel New Hampshire (1984) – New Hampshire
 Clue (1985) – set in a New England mansion
 Death of a Salesman (1985)
 Real Genius (1985) – fictional college similar to MIT in Cambridge, Massachusetts
 Re-Animator (1985) – set in fictional Arkham, Massachusetts
 The Sure Thing (1985)
 Highlander (1986) – "the famous duel on Boston Common"
 One Crazy Summer (1986)
 Baby Boom (1987) – set in Vermont
 Flowers in the Attic (1987) – Ipswich MA
 The Devil's Disciple (1987) – Websterbridge, NH
 The Witches of Eastwick (1987) – set in fictional Eastwick, Rhode Island
 Beetlejuice (1988) – set in fictional Winter River, Connecticut
 Funny Farm (1988)
 Mystic Pizza (1988) – set in Mystic, Connecticut
 The Nest (1988)
 Second Sight (1989) – comedy set in Boston, Massachusetts 
 Sweet Hearts Dance (1988)
 Witchery (1988)
 Dead Poets Society (1989) – set at a fictional academy in Vermont
 Field of Dreams (1989) – they visit Fenway Park in Boston
 Glory (1989) – the 54th Massachusetts Infantry form and train in Readville, now a suburb of Boston, and march through Boston
 Pet Sematary (1989)
 War of the Roses (1989)
 Warlock (1989)

1990s
 It (1990)
 Mermaids (1990) – set in the fictional town of Eastport, Massachusetts
 Teenage Mutant Ninja Turtles (1990) – set in New York City and rural New England
 Once Around (1991) – Renata starts at her parents' place in New England
 Other People's Money (1991)
 Run (1991) – set in Boston, Massachusetts
 What About Bob? (1991) – set at Lake Winnipesaukee, New Hampshire
 The Babe (1992) – set in Boston, Massachusetts
 Far and Away (1992)
 HouseSitter (1992)
 Lorenzo's Oil (1992)
 Mr. Baseball (1992) – set at Fenway Park
 Scent of a Woman (1992) – set at a New England boarding school
 School Ties (1992) – set at a fictional elite Massachusetts boarding school
 Ethan Frome (1993)
 The Firm (1993)
 The Good Son (1993)
 Hocus Pocus (1993) – set in Salem, Massachusetts
 Malice (1993) – set in Boston, Massachusetts
 The Man Without a Face (1993)
 Needful Things (1993)
 Where the Rivers Flow North (1993)
 Blown Away (1994) – set in Boston, Massachusetts
 Dumb & Dumber (1994) – their journey begins in Providence, Rhode Island
 Federal Hill (1994) – set in Providence, Rhode Island
 In the Mouth of Madness (1994) – set in the fictional town of Hobbs End, New Hampshire
 The Inkwell (1994)
 The Last Seduction (1994)
 Little Women (1994) – set based on Louisa May Alcott's childhood home in Concord, Massachusetts
 The Next Karate Kid (1994) – set in Brookline, Massachusetts
 Quiz Show (1994) – partly set at Van Doren's parents' house in Connecticut
 The Ref (1994) – set in Connecticut
 The River Wild (1994)
 The Shawshank Redemption (1994) – set in Maine
 With Honors (1994) – set at Harvard in Cambridge, Massachusetts
 Wolf (1994)
 Casper (1995) – set in Friendship, Maine
 Dolores Claiborne (1995)
 Jumanji (1995) – set in the fictional town of Brantford, New Hampshire
 Outbreak (1995) – the monkey's owner lands at Logan Airport, Boston, Massachusetts
 The Scarlet Letter (1995)
 Celtic Pride (1996) – set in Boston, Massachusetts
 The Crucible (1996) – Salem, Massachusetts
 Death of a Salesman (1996)
 Eden (1996)
 Man with a Plan (1996)
 Mrs. Winterbourne (1996)
 The Spitfire Grill (1996)
 Amistad (1997) – State House in Providence
 Good Will Hunting (1997) – set in Boston and Cambridge, Massachusetts
 The Ice Storm (1997) – set in New Canaan, Connecticut
 Lolita (1997)
 The Matchmaker (1997) – Sean follows Marcy to Boston, Massachusetts
 The Myth of Fingerprints (1997)
 Skeletons (1997)
 That Darn Cat (1997)
 Affliction (1998)
 Animals with the Tollkeeper (1998)
 A Civil Action (1998) – set in Woburn, Massachusetts
 Monument Ave. (1998) – set in the Charlestown neighborhood of Boston
 Next Stop Wonderland (1998) – set in Boston, Massachusetts
 One True Thing (1998)
 The Parent Trap (1998)
 Practical Magic (1998)
 Safe Men (1998) – set in Providence, Rhode Island
 The Spanish Prisoner (1998)
 Stranger in the Kingdom (1998)
 There's Something About Mary (1998)
 The Boondock Saints (1999) – set in Boston, Massachusetts
 The Cider House Rules (1999) – set in Maine
 Girl, Interrupted (1999) – set in the Boston suburb of Belmont, Massachusetts
 The Iron Giant (1999)
 Lake Placid (1999) – set in Maine
 Message in a Bottle (1999)
 The Out-of-Towners (1999)
 Outside Providence (1999) – set in Providence, Rhode Island
 The Thomas Crown Affair (1999) – Boston, Massachusetts
 A Wake in Providence (1999) – Providence, Rhode Island
 The Love Letter (1999)

2000s
 Almost Famous (2000) – one of the stops is Boston
 Death of a Salesman (2000)
 Me, Myself and Irene (2000) – set in Rhode Island
 The Perfect Storm (2000) – they sail from Gloucester, Massachusetts
 The Skulls (2000) – Yale University in Connecticut
 State and Main (2000)
 The Weight of Water (2000) – set in New Hampshire
 What Lies Beneath (2000) – set in Vermont
 You Can Count on Me (2000) – early scene where he borrows money set in Worcester, Massachusetts
 Blow (2001) – starts in George Jung's hometown of Weymouth, Massachusetts
 The Blue Diner (2001) – set in Boston
 Harvard Man (2001)
 The Heist (2001) – a robbery at a small Boston airport
 In the Bedroom (2001) – set in mid-coast Maine
 Legally Blonde (2001) – Elle is a student at Harvard
 Riding in Cars with Boys (2001)
 Summer Catch (2001) – Cape Cod, Massachusetts
 Super Troopers (2001)
 Wet Hot American Summer (2001)
 What's the Worst That Could Happen? (2001) – filmed (and presumably set) in Boston and elsewhere in MA
 Cabin Fever (2002)
 Confessions of a Dangerous Mind (2002)
 Men in Black II (2002) - Agent J visits former Agent K in Truro, Massachusetts
 Mister Deeds (2002) – set in New Hampshire
 The Gray Man (2002)
 The Skulls II (2002)
 Alex & Emma (2003) – set in Boston
 Anger Management (2003) – they drive to Boston to visit Buddy's mother
 Behind the Red Door (2003) – set in Boston
 Dreamcatcher (2003)
 Dumb and Dumberer: When Harry Met Lloyd (2003)
 The Human Stain (2003)
 Legally Blonde 2: Red, White & Blonde (2003)
 Mona Lisa Smile (2003) – set at Wellesley College in Wellesley, Massachusetts
 Mystic River (2003) – set in Boston
 The Recruit (2003) – James starts as a bartender in Boston
 The Skulls III (2003)
 X2 (2003) – they visit Iceman's parents' home in Boston
 Irish Eyes (2004)
 Saint Ralph (2004)
 Spartan (2004)
 The Stepford Wives (2004) – set in Connecticut
 Still We Believe: The Boston Red Sox Movie (2004)
 Welcome to Mooseport (2004)
 The Family Stone (2005)
 Fever Pitch (2005)
 Ice Princess (2005) – Harvard in Cambridge, Massachusetts
 War of the Worlds (2005) – Ray tries to flee to Boston to meet his ex-wife
 Live Free or Die (2006 film) (2006)
 The Departed (2006) – set in Boston
 Islander (2006) – set in Vinalhaven, Maine
 The Legend of Lucy Keyes (2006)
 Little Children (2006)
 United 93 (2006)
 Vacationland (2006)
 Black Irish (2007)
 Dan in Real Life (2007) – set in Rhode Island
 Everybody Wants to Be Italian (2007) – set in Boston
 The Game Plan (2007)
 Gone Baby Gone (2007) – set in Boston
 The Great Debaters (2007) – they travel to debate at Harvard, in Cambridge, Massachusetts
 21 (2008) – MIT and Harvard Square in Cambridge, Massachusetts
 The Forbidden Kingdom (2008) – set in Boston
 My Best Friend's Girl (2008) – set in Boston
 The Women (2008) – Connecticut
 The Boondock Saints II: All Saints Day (2009)
 Knowing (2009) – set in Lexington, Massachusetts
 The Maiden Heist (2009)
 Surrogates (2009)
 Tell-Tale (2009)
The Vicious Kind (2009) – set in Norfolk, Connecticut
 The Way We Get By (2009)

2010s
 All Good Things (2010) – set in Vermont and Connecticut
 Conviction (2010) – based in Ayer, Massachusetts
 Edge of Darkness (2010)
 The Fighter (2010) – set in Lowell, Massachusetts
 The Ghost Writer (2010) – set on Cape Cod, Massachusetts
 Grown Ups (2010)
 Knight and Day (2010) – the action passes through June's hometown of Boston
 Leap Year (2010) – starts and ends in Boston
 Shutter Island (2010) – set on an island outside Boston
 The Social Network (2010) – set at Harvard University in Cambridge, Massachusetts
 The Town (2010) – set in Charlestown and Cambridge, Massachusetts
 The Innkeepers (2011) – set at the Yankee Pedlar Inn in Torrington, Connecticut
 Man on the Train (2011) – set somewhere in New England
 Sucker Punch (2011) – set in Brattleboro, Vermont
 Ted (2012) – set in Boston, Massachusetts
 Moonrise Kingdom (2012) – set on the fictional New England island of New Penzance
 The Conjuring (2013) – set in Harrisville, Rhode Island
 The Heat (2013) – set in Boston, Massachusetts
 The Way, Way Back (2013) – set in Wareham, Massachusetts
 The Equalizer (2014) – set in Somerville, Massachusetts 
 Backgammon (2015) – set in Maine
 Ted 2 (2015)
 Irrational Man (2015) – set in the small-town New England college campus of Braylin
 In the Heart of the Sea (2015) – set in Nantucket 
 The Witch (2015)
 Spotlight (2015)
 Black Mass (2015)
 The Finest Hours (2016) – set in Chatham, Massachusetts on Cape Cod
 Manchester by the Sea (2016) – set in Manchester-by-the-Sea, Massachusetts
 Patriots Day (2016)
 Stronger (2017)
 The Equalizer 2 (2018)
 Proud Mary (2018) - set in Boston
 Knives Out (2019) – set in Massachusetts
 The Lighthouse (2019) – set in 1890s New England

2020s
 Ava (2020)
 Summer of Mesa (2020) – set on Cape Cod, Massachusetts
 The Block Island Sound (2020)
 Hubie Halloween (2020)
 Hocus Pocus 2 (2022) - Set in Salem, Massachusetts

References
 IMDb
 New England in Feature Films

Lists of films by setting